Lewis University Airport  is a public use airport located 20 miles (32 km) southwest of Chicago, in the village of Romeoville in Will County, Illinois, United States. The Joliet Regional Port District assumed ownership of the airport in 1989.
The National Weather Service Chicago, Illinois (Chicago Forecast Office) is adjacent to the airport.

History
Lewis University Airport was the original base for Clarence A. "Clancy" Hess's operation "Wings of Hope".

The airport has had numerous upgrades in recent years, including widening and reconstructing of taxiways and lights, construction of a control tower, and renovation of ramps. With construction of the control tower, the airport hopes to attract more business aviation and more business jets to be based at Lewis University Airport.

The airport's new control tower was completed in November 2022, and the tower opened on December 1 of that year. The project was supported by the Rebuild Illinois program, which was an economic bill sponsored by the State of Illinois to help recover from the Coronavirus pandemic. The state covered 75% of the $8 million project.

Facilities and aircraft

 Runway 2/20: 6,500 x 100 ft (1,981 x 30 m), surface: concrete
 Runway 9/27: 5,500 x 75 ft (1,676 x 23 m), surface: asphalt

For 12-month period ending August 1, 2019, the airport had 104,000 aircraft operations, an average of 285 per day: 96% general aviation and 4% air taxi. For the same time period, there were 133 aircraft based at this airport: 109 single-engine and 13 multi-engine airplanes, 7 jet airplanes, and 4 helicopters.

Accidents and incidents 
On July 14, 1989, three people were killed when a Cessna 177 Cardinal crashed into a factory shortly after takeoff from Lewis. The engine reportedly was running but developing little power. All three aboard died, and two people on the ground were injured.
On June 26, 2011, a Cessna 210 crashed while attempting to land at Lewis. Witnesses said the plane appeared to be having troubles and wanted to divert to Lewis. The aircraft impacted power lines, killing one and seriously wounding another.
On May 13, 2021, the pilot of a Beechcraft B24R Sierra 200 reported that engine speed "suddenly dipped down" on climbout after takeoff from Lewis. Attempts to restore power were unsuccessful, and the plane landed on a nearby highway.

See also
 Lewis University

References

External links

Airports in Will County, Illinois
Romeoville, Illinois
University and college airports